Apis mellifera anatoliaca (known commonly as the Anatolian honey bee) is a subspecies of Apis mellifera (honey bees).

Habitat
This bee is endemic to the Anatolian region of Turkey, populating the central and western parts of the country, but not European Turkey, as later research identified the honey bees of the Thrace region as primarily A. m. carnica.

Taxonomy
This bee type belongs to the branch of bee classified by Ruttner (1988) as "Oriental". A recent genetic study confirmed that the sub-species belongs to an Eastern Europe branch of the genotype of the honey bee. Mitochondrial Deoxyribonucleaic acid (mtDNA) analysis of Thracian bees showed some similarities to the Apis mellifera carnica, although this same similarity was absent from Anatolian bee samples (Smith and Brown (1990) & Meixner et al. (1993). The cause of this is given as inter-breeding of native populations with nearby Austrian, Slovakian and Croatian bees.

References

External links

H. V. Gençer, E. Başpinar, Ç. Firatli (2003) website The Graphic Evaluation of Morphological Characters in Honey Bees (Apis mellifera L.) by Chernoff Faces TARIM BİLİMLERİ DERGİSİ 2004, 10 (3) 245–249

mellifera anatoliaca
Western honey bee breeds